This is a list of aircraft manufacturers sorted alphabetically by International Civil Aviation Organization (ICAO)/common name. It contains the ICAO/common name, manufacturers names, country and other data, with the known years of operation in parentheses.

The ICAO names are listed in bold. Having an ICAO name does not mean that a manufacturer is still in operation today. Just that some of the aircraft produced by that manufacturer are still flying.

H
Hagglund, Hägglund & Söner – Sweden
HAI, Hellenic Aerospace Industry – Greece
Hainz, Franz Hainz – Germany
Halberstadt, Halberstädter Flugzeug-Werke GmbH – Germany
Hall, Cunningham-Hall Aircraft Corporation – United States
Halsted, Barry Halsted – United States
Hamburger Flugzeugbau, Hamburger Flugzeugbau GmbH – Germany, (1932-1940) > Blohm & Voss
Hamilton, Hamilton Aircraft Company Inc – United States
Hamilton, Hamilton Aviation – United States
H&E Paramotores, Madrid, Spain
Handley Page, Handley Page (Reading) Ltd – United Kingdom
Handley Page, Handley Page Ltd – United Kingdom, (?-1970) > Scottish Aviation
Hannaford, Hannaford Aircraft – United States
Hannover, Hannoversche Waggonfabrik AG – Germany
Hanriot, Aeroplanes Hanriot et Cie – France, (1914–1936) > SNCAC
Hansa-Brandenburg, Hansa-Brandenburg – Germany, > Heinkel
Hanseatische Flugzeugwerke, Hanseatische Flugzeugwerke – Germany, (Hansa)
HAPI, HAPI Engines Inc – United States
Harbin, Harbin Aircraft Manufacturing Corporation – China, (1952–?) (HAMC)
Harbin EMBRAER, Harbin Embraer Aircraft Industry Company Ltd – China
Harlow, Harlow Aircraft Co. – United States
Harmening's High Flyers, Genoa, Illinois and later in Big Stone City, South Dakota, United States
Harmon (1), James B. Harmon – United States
Harmon (2), D & J Harmon Co Inc – United States
Harmon (2), Harmon Rocket LLC – United States
Harper Aircraft Manufacturing Company, Harper Aircraft Manufacturing Company Inc. – United States
Harris & Sheldon, Harris & Sheldon Ltd – United Kingdom
HAT, Hellenic Aeronautical Technologies – Greece
Hatz, John D. Hatz – United States
HAVELSAN, Hava Elektronik Sanayi (Air Electronic Industries) – Turkey
Hawker, Hawker Aircraft Ltd – United Kingdom, (1920–1961) > Hawker Siddeley
Hawker De Havilland, Hawker De Havilland Australia Pty Ltd – Australia
Hawker De Havilland, Hawker De Havilland Ltd – Australia
Hawker Pacific Aerospace, Hawker Pacific Aerospace – United Kingdom, (1980–present)
Hawker Siddeley, Hawker Siddeley Aviation Ltd – United Kingdom
Hawksley, A W Hawksley Ltd. – United Kingdom
HB-Aircraft, HB-Aircraft Industries Luftfahrzeug AG – Austria
HB-Flugtechnik, HB-Flugtechnik GmbH – Austria
 HBN, HBN Group – United Kingdom/France, (Hawker, Breguet and Nord-Aviation)
Heinkel, Ernst Heinkel AG – Germany, (?-1959) > FUS
Heintz, Christophe Heintz – France
Helibras, Helicópteros do Brasil SA – Brazil
Helikopter Services, Helikopter Services – Unknown
Helio, Helio Aircraft Company – United States
Helio, Helio Aircraft Corporation – United States
Helio, Helio Aircraft Ltd – United States
Heliopolis, Heliopolis Air Works – Egypt
Helipro, Helipro Corporation International – United States
Heli-Sport, CH-7 Heli-Sport Srl., Torino, Italy
Helwan, Helwan Air Works – Egypt
Henderson, Henderson Aero Specialties Inc – United States
Henschel, Henschel & Son – Germany
HESA, IRan Aircraft Industries – Iran
Heston Aircraft, Heston Aircraft Co. Ltd. – United Kingdom
HFB, Hamburger Flugzeugbau GmbH – Germany, (postwar) > Messerschmitt-Bölkow-Blohm (MBB)
Highlander, Highlander Aircraft Corporation – United States
Hillberg Helicopters, Fountain Valley, California, United States
Hiller, Hiller Aircraft Company Inc – United States
Hiller, Hiller Aircraft Corporation – United States
Hiller, Hiller Aviation Inc – United States
Hiller, Hiller Helicopters – United States
Hiller, Hiller Helicopters Inc – United States
Hindustan Aeronautics Limited, Bangalore, India
Hindustan, Hindustan Aircraft Ltd – India
Hiro Naval Arsenal, Hiro Naval Arsenal – Japan
Hirth, Wolf Hirth GmbH – Germany
Hispano, La Hispano Aviación S.A. – Spain, (?-1972) > CASA
Hispano-Suiza, Hispano-Suiza – France
Historical Aircraft, Historical Aircraft Corporation – United States
HK, HK Aircraft Technology AG – Germany
HOAC, HOAC Austria Flugzeugwerk Wiener Neustadt GmbH – Austria
Hoffmann, Hoffmann Aircraft Flugzeugproduktion und Entwicklung GmbH – Austria
Hoffmann, Hoffmann Flugzeugbau-Friesach GmbH – Austria
Hoffmann, Wolf Hoffmann Flugzeugbau KG – Germany
Holcomb, Jerry Holcomb – United States
Hollmann, Martin Hollmann – United States
Honda Aircraft Company, subsidiary of Honda Motor Company Ltd – Japan
Honda-Mississippi, Honda & Mississippi State University – Japan/United States
Hongdu, Hongdu Aviation Industry Group – China
Hovey, Robert W. Hovey – United States
Howard (1), Howard Aircraft Corporation – United States
Howard (2), Howard Aero Inc – United States
Howard (2), Howard Aero Manufacturing Division of Business Aircraft Corporation – United States
Howard Hughes Engineering, Howard Hughes Engineering Pty Ltd – Australia
HPA, High Performance Aircraft GmbH & Co KG – Germany
Huff-Daland, Huff-Daland – United States, (1920–1933) (Ogdensburg Aeroway Corp.) > Huff-Daland Aero Corporation > Huff-Daland Aero Company > Keystone Aircraft Corporation
Hughes, Hughes Helicopters Division of Summa Corporation – United States
Hughes, Hughes Helicopters Inc – United States
Hughes, Hughes Tool Company, Aircraft Division – United States
Humbert Aviation, Ramonchamp, France
Hummel Aviation, J. Morry Hummel, Bryan, Ohio, United States
Hunting, Hunting Aircraft Ltd – United Kingdom, (1957–1959) > British Aircraft Corporation
Hunting Percival, Hunting Percival Aircraft Ltd – United Kingdom
Hurel-Dubois, Société de Construction des Avions Hurel-Dubois – France
Hybrid Aircraft Corporation – United States
Hydroplane, Gidroplan ooo – Russia
Hydroplane, Hydroplane Ltd – Russia
Hynes, Hynes Helicopter Inc – United States
Hyundai, Hyundai Precision Industry – South Korea, > Korea Aerospace Industries

I
IAI, Israel Aerospace Industries Ltd – Israel
Iannotta, Dott. Ing. Orlando Iannotta – Italy
IAR, IAR (Industria Aeronautică Română) SA – Romania
Iberavia, Spain
IBIS, Ibis Aerospace Ltd – Czech Republic/Taiwan
Ibis Aircraft, Ibis Aircraft S.A., Cali, Colombia
ICA, Intreprinderea de Constructii Aeronautice – Romania
ID Integration, ID Integration, Inc. – United States
Ikar, OOO Aviaklub Ikar – Ukraine
Ikarus, Ikarus Tvornica Aero i Hydroplana – Serbia and Montenegro
Ilyushin, Aviatsionnyi Kompleks Imeni S. V. Ilyushina OAO – Russia
Ilyushin, Ilyushin OKB – Russia
 Ilyushin – see Aviation Association Ilyushin
IMAM, Industrie Meccaniche e Aeronautiche Meridionali – Italy
IMCO, Intermountain Manufacturing Company – United States, (1962–1966) > Rockwell
IMP, IMP Group Ltd – Canada
Impulse, Impulse Aircraft GmbH – Germany
Indaer Chile, Industria Aeronáutica de Chile – Chile
Indaer Peru, Industria Aeronautica del Peru SA – Peru
Independence Paragliding, (A brand of Fly-market Flugsport-Zubehör GmbH & Co. KG) Eisenberg, Germany
IAe, Bandung – Indonesia
Indus, IndUS Aviation Inc – United States
Indy Aircraft Limited, Independence, Iowa, United States
Industrias Aeronauticas y Mecanicas, Industria Aeronáutica y Mecánica del Estado (IAME) – Argentina, (1953–1957) (Aeronautical and Mechanical Industries of the State) > DINFIA
Infinity Power Chutes,  Sturgis, Michigan, United States
 Iniziative Industriali Italiane, Iniziative Industriali Italiane – Italy
Innovation, Innovation Engineering Inc – United States
INPAER - Brazil
Instituo Aerotecnico, Instituto Aerotécnica (Fabrica Militar de Aviones) – Argentina, (1943–1957) (IA) > DINFIA
Instytut Lotnictwa, Instytut Lotnictwa – Poland
Inter-Air, International Aircraft Manufacturing Inc – United States, (?-1967) > Bellanca
Interavia, Interavia Konstruktorskoye Buro AO – Russia
Interceptor Corporation, Interceptor Corporation – United States
International Helicopters, International Helicopters Inc – United States
InterPlane Aircraft, Zbraslavice, Czech Republic
Interstate Engineering Corporation|Interstate, Interstate Engineering Corporation – United States
Intracom, Intracom General Machinery SA – Switzerland
IPAI, IPAI, Escola de Engenharia de Sâo Carlos – Brazil
IPT, Instituto de Pesquisas Tecnologicas – Brazil
IPTN, PT. Industri Pesawat Terbang Nusantara – Indonesia
IRGC, Institute of Industrial Research and Development of the Iran Revolutionary Guard Corps – Iran
IRIAF, Islamic Republic of Iran Air Force – Iran
Irkut, Irkutskoye Aviatsionnoye Proizvodstvennoye Obedinenie OAO – Russia
IRMA, Intreprinderea de Reparat Material Aeronautic – Romania
Isaacs, John O. Isaacs – United Kingdom
ISAE, Integrated Systems Aero Engineering Inc – United States
Island Aircraft, Island Aircraft Ltd – United Kingdom
Israviation, Israviation Ltd – Israel
Issoire, Issoire Aviation SA – France
ITV Parapentes, Épagny, Haute-Savoie, France
Ivanov Aero, Hradec Králové, Czech Republic

J
J & AS, J & AS Aero Design Sp z oo – Poland
Jabiru, Jabiru Aircraft Pty Ltd – Australia
Jackaroo, Jackaroo Aircraft Ltd – United Kingdom
Jag Helicopter, JAG Helicopter Group LLC – United States
James, James Aviation – New Zealand
Janowski, Jaroslaw Janowski – Poland
Javelin, Javelin Aircraft Company Inc – United States
JDM – see Avions JDM
Jeffair, Jeffair Corporation – United States
Jeof srl, Candiana, Italy
Jetcrafters, Jetcrafters Inc – United States
Jet Pocket, Chantelle, Allier, France
Jetprop, Jetprop LLC – United States
Jetstar, Jetstar Inc Australia
Jetstream, Jetstream Aircraft Ltd – United Kingdom
Jingmen Aviation, Jingmen, China
Jodel, Avions Jodel SA – France
Jodel, Société des Avions Jodel – France
Johnson, Johnson Aircraft Inc – United States
Johnson, Johnston Aircraft Service – United States
Jojo Wings, Roudnice nad Labem, Czech Republic
Jordan Aerospace, Jordan Aerospace Industries – Jordan
Jovair – United States
Junkers, Junkers Flugzeug- und Motorenwerke AG – Germany
Junqua, Roger Junqua – France
Jurca, Marcel Jurca – France
Just Aircraft, Walhalla, South Carolina, United States

K
K & S, K & S Aircraft – Canada
K & S, K & S Aircraft Supply – Canada
Kader, Kader Aircraft Factory – Egypt
Kaiser, Kaiser Flugzeugbau GmbH – Germany
Laurent de Kalbermatten, Villars-sur-Glâne, Switzerland
Kalinauskas, Rolandas Kalinauskas – Lithuania
Kaman, Kaman Aerospace Corporation – United States
Kaman, Kaman Aircraft Corporation – United States
Kaman, Kaman Corporation – United States
Kaminskas, Rim Kaminskas – United States
Kamov, Kamov OAO – Russia
Kamov, Kamov OKB – Russia
Kamov, Vertoletyi Nauchno-Tekhnicheskiy Kompleks Imeni N. I. Kamova – Russia
Kanpur, Indian Air Force, Aircraft Manufacturing Depot – India
KARI, Korea Aerospace Research Institute – South Korea
Kari-Keen, Kari-Keen Aircraft Inc – United States
Kawanishi Aircraft Company, Kawanishi Aircraft Company – Japan
Kawasaki, Kawasaki Heavy Industries Ltd – Japan
Kawasaki, Kawasaki Jukogyo KK – Japan
Kawasaki, Kawasaki Kokuki Kogyo K. K. – Japan
Kayaba, Kayaba Industrial Co. – Japan
Kazan, Kazansky Vertoletnyi Zavod AO – Russia
KEA, Kratiko Ergostasio Aeroplanon – Greece (1925–present)
Keleher, James J. Keleher – United States
Kelly, Dudley R. Kelly – United States
Kelowna, Kelowna Flightcraft Group – Canada
Kestrel (1), Kestrel Aircraft Company – United States
Kestrel (2), Kestrel Sport Aviation – Canada
Keuthan, Keuthan Aircraft – United States, (?-1996) > Aero Adventure Aviation
Keystone Aircraft Corporation, Keystone Aircraft Corporation – United States, (1920–1933) (Ogdensburg Aeroway Corp.) > Keystone-Loening > Curtiss-Wright
Khrunichev, Gosudarstvennyi Kosmicheskii Nauchno-Proizvodstvennyi Tsentr Imeni M V Khrunicheva – Russia
Kieger, André Kieger – France
Killingsworth, Richard Killingsworth – United States
Kimball, Jim Kimball Enterprises Inc – United States
Kimball, Michael G. Kimbrel – United States
Kimfly D.O.O., Vodice, Slovenia
Kinetic, Kinetic Aviation Inc – United States
King's, The King's Engineering Fellowship – United States
Kjeller, Kjeller Flyvemaskinsfabrik – Norway
Kingsbury Aviation. London, England
Klemm, Hans Klemm Flugzeugbau – Germany, > Siebel
Klemm, Klemm Leichtflugzeugbau GmbH – Germany
Klemm, Klemm-Flugzeuge GmbH – Germany
KLS Composites, KLS Composites – United States
Kokusai, Kokusai – Japan
Kolb, Kolb Aircraft Inc – United States
Kolb, Kolb Company Inc – United States
Kolb, The New Kolb Aircraft Company Inc – United States
Kondor, Kondor – Germany
Koolhoven, Koolhoven Aircraft – Netherlands
Korea Aerospace, Korea Aerospace Industries Ltd – South Korea, (KAI)
Korean Air, Korean Air Lines Company Ltd – South Korea
Kovach-Elmendorf, Alexander Kovach and Leonard Elmendorf – United States
Kovacs, Joseph Kovács – Brazil
Kraft, Phil Kraft – United States
Krasniye Kryl'ya – Taganrog, Russia
Kress, Wilhelm Kress – Austria-Hungary
Kreider-Reisner, Kreider-Reisner Aircraft Company Inc – United States
Kyūshū Aircraft Company, Kyūshū Aircraft Company – Japan

L
Liaoning Ruixiang General Aviation Manufacture Company Limited, Shenyang, China
La France, Neil La France – United States
Laird, E. M. Laird Airplane Company – United States
Lake, A.E.R.O. Aircraft Services, LLC  – United States
Lake, Lake Aircraft Corporation – United States
Lake, Lake Aircraft Division of Consolidated Aeronautics Inc. – United States
Lake, Lake Aircraft Inc. – United States
Lake, Lake Amphibian Inc. – United States
Lambert, Lambert Aircraft Engineering bvba – Belgium
Lammer Geyer, Lammer Geyer Aviation – South Africa
Lancair, Lancair Group Inc – United States
Lancair, Lancair International Inc – United States
Lancashire, Lancashire Aircraft Company Ltd – United Kingdom
Larkin Aircraft, Larkin Aircraft Supply Co. – Australia, (LASCO)
Laser, Laser Aerobatics – Australia
Latécoère, Société Industrielle d'Aviation Latécoère – France
Laven, Joe Laven – United States
Laverda, Laverda SpA – Italy
LAVIASA, Latinoamericana de Aviación S.A. – Argentina
Lavochkin, Lavochkin (OKB-301) – Russia
Layzell Gyroplanes –  Quedgeley, Gloucester, UK
Leading Edge Air Foils, Lyons, Wisconsin, United States
Lear, Lear Inc – United States
Learjet, Bombardier Aerospace Learjet – United States
Learjet, Learjet Corporation – United States, (?-1990) > Bombardier Aerospace
Learjet, Learjet Industries Inc – United States
Learjet, Learjet Corporation – United States
Learjet, Learjet Inc – United States
Leavens, Leavens Brothers Ltd – Canada
Lederlin, François Lederlin – France
Legend, Legend Aircraft Inc – United States
Leger Aviation, Archiac, France
Leger, Gilles Leger – Canada
LeO, Lioré et Olivier – France
Les Mureaux – see ANF Mureaux
Let, Let Národní Podnik – Czechoslovakia
Let, Let AS – Czech Republic
Letov, Letov – Czechoslovakia
Levasseur, Pierre Levasseur – France
Levy, Constructions Aeronautiques J. Levy – France
Leza AirCam Corporation — see Lockwood Aircraft
Leza-Lockwood — see Lockwood Aircraft
Liberty (1), Liberty Aeronautical – United States
Liberty (2), Liberty Aerospace Inc – United States
Lichtwerk, NV Lichtwerk – Netherlands
Light Aero, Light Aero Inc – United States
Light Miniature Aircraft, Okeechobee, Florida, United States
Light Wing, Light Wing AG – Switzerland
Lightning Bug, Lightning Bug Aircraft Corporation – United States
Lilienthal, Otto Lilienthal – Germany
Linke-Hofmann, Linke-Hofmann Werke A. G. – Germany
Lipnur, Lembaga Industri Penerbangan Nurtanio – Indonesia
Lisunov, Lisunov OKB – Russia
Liteflite, Botany, New South Wales, Australia
LiteWing Aircraft, Caryville, Tennessee, United States
Little Wing Autogyros, Inc., Mayflower, Arkansas, United States
Lmaasa, Lockheed Martin Aircraft Argentina SA – Argentina
Load Ranger, Load Ranger Inc – United States
Lockheed Corporation – United States, (1912–1996) > Lockheed Martin
Lockheed Martin, Lockheed Martin Corporation – United States, (1996–present)
Lockheed Martin-Boeing, see Lockheed Martin and Boeing – United States
Lockheed-Azcarate, Lockheed-Azcarate SA – Mexico, (LASA)
Lockheed-Boeing, see Lockheed and Boeing – United States
Lockheed-Kaiser, Avions Lockheed-Kaiser – Argentina
Lockwood Aircraft Corporation — United States
Loehle, Loehle Aircraft Corporation – United States
Loening Aeronautical, Loening Aircraft Co. Inc. – United States, (Loening Aeronautical Engineering Corp. or Grover Loening Aircraft Co. Inc.)
Lohner, Jacob Lohner Werke und Sohn – Austria-Hungary
Loire, Loire – France
Lombardi, Aeronautica Lombardi – Italy
Lombardi, Francis Lombardi & Companie – Italy
Long, David Long – United States
Longren, Longren Aircraft Company Inc – United States
Lopresti, LoPresti Inc – United States
Loravia, Lorraine Aviation – France
Lowe, Willard & Fowler Engineering Company
Letecké Opravovne Trencin SP|LOT, Letecké Opravovne Trencin SP – Slovakia
Loving-Wayne, Neal V. Loving, Wayne Aircraft Company – United States
LTV, Ling-Temco-Vought Inc – United States
LTV, LTV Aerospace Corporation – United States
Lualdi-Tassotti, Lualdi-Tassotti – Italy
Lucas, Emile Lucas – France
Luftfahrzeug-Gesellschaft m.b.H. (LFG), Germany, airships 1909–1932, aeroplanes 1915–1933
Luftschiffbau Schütte-Lanz, Germany, rigid airships 1909–1917, aeroplanes 1915–1918
Luftverkehrsgesellschaft m.b.H., Berlin-Johannisthal – Germany
Lunds Tekniske, Lunds Tekniske – Norway
Lundy, Brian Lundy – United States
Luscombe, Luscombe Aircraft Corporation – United States
Luscombe, Luscombe Airplane Corporation – United States
Luscombe, Luscombe Airplane Development Corporation – United States
Luton, Luton Aircraft Ltd – United Kingdom
LWD, Lotnicze Warsztaty Doświadczalne – Poland, (Experimental Aviation Workshops)
LWS, Lubelska Wytwórnia Samolotów – Poland, (Lublin Aircraft Factory)
Lyavin, Peter Lyavin – Russia

See also
 Aircraft
 List of aircraft engine manufacturers
 List of aircraft manufacturers

H